Namık Kemal Zeybek (born 1944) is a Turkish politician and was leader of the Democratic Party (2011 - 2012). A former civil servant and district governor, he was government minister in different cabinets.

He was born 1944 in the village of Kitre in Bayburt Province, northeastern Turkey. He graduated in 1966 from the Law School of Ankara University. After serving ten years as a district governor in several places, he was promoted to the undersecretary post at the Ministry of Customs and Monopoly. Zeybek worked then four years long as a coordinator in the private sector.

In 1987, he entered politics and was elected Deputy of Istanbul into the parliament from the Motherland Party. Between 1989 and 1991, he served as the Minister of Culture in the cabinets of Turgut Özal and Yıldırım Akbulut. During his tenure, the festivities of Newroz were allowed in 1991. Later in 1996, Zeybek was appointed again minister in the coalition cabinet of Necmettin Erbakan.

In 2007, Namık Kemal Zeybek joined the Great Union Party, and became its secretary general for a short time. In 2010, he entered the Democratic Party. At the 10th party congress held on January 15, 2011 in Ankara, he was elected leader of its party.

References

1944 births
Living people
People from Bayburt
Ankara University Faculty of Law alumni
Turkish jurists
Turkish civil servants
Democrat Party (Turkey, current) politicians
Government ministers of Turkey
Leaders of political parties in Turkey
Ministers of Culture of Turkey
Deputies of Istanbul
Members of the 20th Parliament of Turkey
Members of the 54th government of Turkey
Ministers of State of Turkey